Trengganu Utara was a federal constituency in Terengganu, Malaysia, that has been represented in the Federal Legislative Council from 1955 to 1959.

The federal constituency was created in the 1955 redistribution and is mandated to return a single member to the Federal Legislative Council under the first past the post voting system.

History 
It was abolished in 1959 when it was redistributed.

Representation history

State constituency

Election results

References 

Defunct Terengganu federal constituencies
Constituencies established in 1955
Constituencies disestablished in 1959